Nigel Oscar Weiss FRS (16 December 1936 – 24 June 2020) was an astronomer and mathematician, and leader in the field of astrophysical and geophysical fluid dynamics. He was Emeritus Professor of Mathematical Astrophysics at the University of Cambridge.

Education
Born in South Africa, Weiss studied at Hilton College, Natal, Rugby School and Clare College, Cambridge, and had been a fellow of Clare College since 1965. He read for his PhD in 1961 with a thesis on Variable Hydromagnetic Motions.

Career
In 1987 he became Professor of Mathematical Astrophysics at the University of Cambridge.

Between 2000 and 2002 he was President of the Royal Astronomical Society, and in 2007 was awarded the Gold Medal, the society's highest award.

Research
Weiss published extensively in the field of mathematical astrophysics, specialising in solar and stellar magnetic fields, astrophysical and geophysical fluid dynamics and nonlinear dynamical systems.

In 1966 he was the first to demonstrate and describe the process of 'flux expulsion' by which a conducting fluid undergoing rotating motion acts to expel the magnetic flux from the region of motion, a process now known to occur in the photosphere of the Sun and other stars.

Awards and honours
Weiss was elected a Fellow of the Royal Society (FRS) in 1992. His nomination reads

References

1936 births
2020 deaths
South African astronomers
South African mathematicians
Cambridge mathematicians
Recipients of the Gold Medal of the Royal Astronomical Society
Fellows of the Royal Society
Alumni of Clare College, Cambridge
Fellows of Clare College, Cambridge
Presidents of the Royal Astronomical Society
South African scientists
South African Jews
White South African people
Alumni of Hilton College (South Africa)